Recht op Recht is a Belgian television series produced by the Flemish channel Eén. 45 episodes were aired between 1998 and 2002.

Story 
The story is set in and around the law office "Leduc and Partners" which is led by Paul Emile Leduc. Jurist Chris Haagdoorn is one of the employees. She is assisted by Hugo Van Eyck a former policeman. As lawyers are not allowed to do investigations, Hugo acts as a type of detective although his official position is administrative. Other employees are student Luc Lievens, Gabriël Nukerke and Jessie Vinck.

Cast 
 Chris Haagdoorn - Veerle Dobbelaere
 Hugo Van Eyck - Filip Peeters
 Gabriël Nukerke - Stany Crets (season 1 & 2)
 Luc Lievens - Robbie Cleiren
 Paul Emile Leduc - Tuur De Weert
 Louise Haagdoorn - Blanka Heirman
 Jessie Vinck - Pascale Michiels
 Stanny Michel - Damiaan De Schrijver

Belgian drama television shows
1998 Belgian television series debuts
2002 Belgian television series endings
1990s Belgian television series
2000s Belgian television series
Eén original programming